Maen Si is an intersection of Bamrung Mueang, Worachak, and Chakkraphatdi Phong roads in area of Bangkok's Ban Bat sub-district, Pom Prap Sattru Phai district. It's considered to be the intersection next to the Samran Rat (also known as Pratu Phi) on Bumrung Mueang road near the area of Wat Saket.

Its name "Maen Si" comes from the name of one Mom Ham (หม่อมห้าม; ordinary women who have been concubine or wife of the Thai royal family) of Prince Bhanurangsi Savangwongse or Prince Bhanubandhu Vongsevoradej. Her name is "Maen" (แม้น; while "Si" refers to women), the daughter of Chao Phraya Surawongwaiwat (Worn Bunnag) nobleman and one member of the Bunnag family. When she died Prince Bhanubandhu Vongsevoradej very grieve, because she is a wife he loves. So he organized a great funeral. And donated part of the donation to build a small bridge to commemorate her, named "Saphan Maen Si" across canal on Bamrung Mueang side. Later, when the roads were built, the bridge was demolished. But its name still appears as an intersection to the present.

Landmark of Maen Si intersection is Metropolitan Waterworks Authority (MWA)'s building site on Bamrung Mueang side. It's the first headquarters of MWA build in 1914 during early the reign of King Vajiravudh (Rama VI) and the origin of water supply in Thailand. Today, it's more than 100 years old, but still beautiful with the influence of European architecture and considered one of the historic buildings in Bangkok.  

Besides, Maen Si is also a community of Thai-Tavoyan descent. Their ancestors evacuated the war from Dawei (formerly Tavoy) in Tanintharyi region to Rattanakosin (presently Bangkok) since the reign of King Phutthayotfa Chulalok (Rama I), there's evidence that "Trok Thawai" (ตรอกทวาย; Thawai is Tavoy in Thai) or officially known as Soi Maen Si 1 (ซอยแม้นศรี 1; Maen Si 1 alley).

References

Pom Prap Sattru Phai district
Road junctions in Bangkok